The 2000 United States presidential election in Mississippi took place on November 7, 2000, and was part of the 2000 United States presidential election. Voters chose 7 representatives, or electors to the Electoral College, who voted for president and vice president.

Mississippi was won by Governor George W. Bush with a double digit margin of victory of 16.92%. Bush won most of the counties and congressional districts of the state. Bush dominated the east part of the state. Gore did well in the western part of the state, where he won the 2nd district. , this is the last election in which Jasper County voted for the Republican candidate and the last election in which Yalobusha County voted for the Democratic candidate. This is also the last election in which Mississippi voted to the right of neighboring Alabama. Bush became the first Republican to win the White House without carrying Hinds County since Richard Nixon in 1968.

Results

By county

Counties that flipped from Democratic to Republican
Alcorn (Largest city: Corinth)
Amite (Largest city: Gloster)
Chickasaw (Largest city: Okolona)
Copiah (Largest city: Hazlehurst)
Jasper (Largest city: Bay Springs)
Lawrence (Largest city: Monticello)
Montgomery (Largest city: Winona)
Pike (Largest city: Magnolia)
Walthall (Largest city: Tylertown)
Yazoo (Largest city: Yazoo City)

By congressional district
Bush won 4 of 5 congressional districts, including two held by Democrats.

Electors 

Technically the voters of Mississippi cast their ballots for electors: representatives to the Electoral College. Mississippi is allocated 7 electors because it has 5 congressional districts and 2 senators. All candidates who appear on the ballot or qualify to receive write-in votes must submit a list of 7 electors, who pledge to vote for their candidate and his or her running mate. Whoever wins the majority of votes in the state is awarded all 7 electoral votes. Their chosen electors then vote for president and vice president. Although electors are pledged to their candidate and running mate, they are not obligated to vote for them. An elector who votes for someone other than his or her candidate is known as a faithless elector.

The electors of each state and the District of Columbia met on December 18, 2000 to cast their votes for president and vice president. The Electoral College itself never meets as one body. Instead the electors from each state and the District of Columbia met in their respective capitols. 

The following were the members of the Electoral College from the state. All were pledged to and voted for George W. Bush and Dick Cheney:
Bob Anthony
Miki Cassidy
Thomas Colbert
Delbert Hosemann
Ellen Reineke
John Junkin
Kent Nicaud

References 

Mississippi
2000
2000 Mississippi elections